Andy or Andrew May may refer to:

Andrew J. May (1875–1959), American politician
Andy May (footballer, born 1964), English professional footballer
Andy May (footballer, born 1989), Luxembourg international footballer
Andrew May (historian), Australian historian
Andy May (presenter) (born 1987), English TV and radio presenter